Unfolding is a public art work by artist Bernhard Heiliger located at the Lynden Sculpture Garden near Milwaukee, Wisconsin. The sculpture has an abstract form; it is installed on the patio.

References

Outdoor sculptures in Milwaukee
1968 sculptures
Bronze sculptures in Wisconsin
Abstract sculptures in Wisconsin
1968 establishments in Wisconsin